Miss Earth Guyana is a national beauty pageant for women in Guyana. The winner represents Guyana in Miss Earth.

The pageant
The titleholder of Miss Earth Guyana represents her country at the Miss Earth pageant. The pageant franchise holder for the Miss Guyana Earth Pageant is Simpli Royal. The pageant's mission is to organize and participate in a variety of environmental and educational projects while promoting the pageant, with the specific aim of educating the public and encouraging them to preserve and protect the environment. The main prizes for whoever wins Miss Guyana Earth title include a four-year University of Guyana Scholarship.

The first titleholder of the pageant  was Soyini Frazer who won and crowned Miss Guyana Earth 2010 but was dethroned with only five months into her reign.  The official announcement of the dethronement was made by the organizers, Pamela Dillon (pageant director) and Wasim Khan (chairman) at a press conference at the offices of Simpli Royal.

Titleholders

Miss Earth Guyana 2018
The 1st edition of Miss Earth Guyana pageant will be held on June 23, 2018 in National Cultural Center in Georgetown.

References

External links
Official page

Beauty pageants in Guyana
Guyana
Guyanese awards